The 1983 Dartmouth Big Green football team was an American football team that represented Dartmouth College during the 1983 NCAA Division I-AA football season. Dartmouth tied for third place in the Ivy League.

In their sixth season under head coach Joe Yukica, the Big Green compiled a 4–5–1 record and were outscored 208 to 185. Francis Polsinello and David Fuhrman were the team captains.

The Big Green's 4–2–1 conference record tied for third-best in the Ivy League standings. Dartmouth outscored Ivy opponents 142 to 133. Dartmouth's sole league loss was to its co-champion, Yale. 

Dartmouth played its home games at Memorial Field on the college campus in Hanover, New Hampshire.

Schedule

References

Dartmouth
Dartmouth Big Green football seasons
Ivy League football champion seasons
Dartmouth Big Green football